Lion.Hearts (谈谈情，舞舞狮) is the eleventh international co-production of MediaCorp TV and ntv7. It is a Chinese New Year themed drama which follows the life of young lion dancers. The romantic comedy boasts fast-paced action in the form of traditional Chinese lion dance.

Cast
Wayne Chua (Cai Pei Xuan)
Berg Lee
Tracy Lee
Melvin Sia
William San
Ko Hung
Leslie Chai
Janelle Chin
Phua Chee Kin
Zhang Wei
Monday Kang

External links

Chinese-language drama television series in Malaysia
Singapore Chinese dramas
Singapore–Malaysia television co-productions
2009 Malaysian television series debuts
2009 Malaysian television series endings
2009 Singaporean television series debuts
2009 Singaporean television series endings
NTV7 original programming
Channel 8 (Singapore) original programming